Events from the year 1922 in Canada.

Incumbents

Crown 
 Monarch – George V

Federal government 
 Governor General – Julian Byng 
 Prime Minister – William Lyon Mackenzie King
 Chief Justice – Louis Henry Davies (Prince Edward Island) 
 Parliament – 14th (from 8 March)

Provincial governments

Lieutenant governors 
Lieutenant Governor of Alberta – Robert Brett 
Lieutenant Governor of British Columbia – Walter Cameron Nichol  
Lieutenant Governor of Manitoba – James Albert Manning Aikins    
Lieutenant Governor of New Brunswick – William Pugsley 
Lieutenant Governor of Nova Scotia – MacCallum Grant   
Lieutenant Governor of Ontario – Henry Cockshutt
Lieutenant Governor of Prince Edward Island – Murdock MacKinnon 
Lieutenant Governor of Quebec – Charles Fitzpatrick  
Lieutenant Governor of Saskatchewan – Henry William Newlands

Premiers 
Premier of Alberta – Herbert Greenfield  
Premier of British Columbia – John Oliver  
Premier of Manitoba – Tobias Norris (until August 8) then John Bracken 
Premier of New Brunswick – Walter Foster 
Premier of Nova Scotia – George Henry Murray 
Premier of Ontario – Ernest Drury   
Premier of Prince Edward Island – John Howatt Bell 
Premier of Quebec – Louis-Alexandre Taschereau 
Premier of Saskatchewan – William Melville Martin (until April 5) then Charles Avery Dunning

Territorial governments

Commissioners 
 Gold Commissioner of Yukon – George P. MacKenzie 
 Commissioner of Northwest Territories – William Wallace Cory

Events
January 1 – British Columbia changes from driving on the left to the right 
January 11 – The world's first insulin treatment is made at the Toronto General Hospital. The successful technique would later win a Nobel Prize for its creators, Frederick Banting and Charles Best.
April 5 – Charles Dunning becomes premier of Saskatchewan, replacing William Martin
May 3 – The women of Prince Edward Island win the right to vote
July – Rodeo's first hornless bronc saddle is designed and made by rodeo cowboy and saddle maker Earl Bascom at the Bascom Ranch, Lethbridge, Alberta
August 8 – John Bracken becomes premier of Manitoba, replacing Tobias Norris
September 15 – Prime Minister Mackenzie King refuses to support the British in the Chanak Affair, asserting foreign policy independence for the first time
October 9 – Prairie Bible College opens with eight students in Three Hills, Alberta
October 22 – Dante Monument unveiled in Montreal
December 1 – New Brunswick changes from driving on the left to the right
December 5 – The land around Vimy Ridge is given to Canada by France in gratitude for the Canadian sacrifices during World War I

Full date unknown
Montreal Clock Tower completed
The first licences for private commercial radio stations are issued

Sport 
March 20–22 – The Ontario Hockey Association's Fort William War Veterans win their only Memorial Cup by defeating the South Saskatchewan Junior Hockey League's Regina Pats 8 to 7 in a two-game aggregate played at Shea's Amphitheatre in Winnipeg
March 28 – The NHL's Toronto St. Pats win their first Stanley Cup by defeating the Pacific Coast Hockey Association's Vancouver Millionaires 3 games to 2. The deciding game was played at Toronto's Arena Gardens
December 2 – Queen's University win their first Grey Cup by defeating the Edmonton Elks 13 to 1 in the 10th Grey Cup played at Kingston's Richardson Memorial Stadium

Arts and literature
Nanook of the North is released, the first film to be called a documentary

Births

January to June

January 21 
 Lincoln Alexander, politician and 24th Lieutenant Governor of Ontario (d. 2012)
 Rhoda Wurtele and Rhona Wurtele (d. 2020), skiers
February 13 – Fred E. Soucy, politician 
February 18 – J. Keith Fraser, physical geographer
February 25 
 Molly Bobak, teacher, writer, printmaker and painter (d. 2015)
 Molly Reilly, aviator (d. 1980)
April 3 – Maurice Riel, senator (d. 2007)
April 7 – Nancy Mackay, athlete (d. 2016)
April 24 – Philip Givens, politician, judge and Mayor of Toronto (d. 1995) 
April 26 – Jeanne Sauvé, politician and first female Governor General of Canada (d. 1993)
April 28 – Daryl Seaman, businessman (d. 2009)
May 2 – Alastair Gillespie, businessman and politician (d. 2018)
May 2 – A. M. Rosenthal, columnist and newspaper editor (d. 2006)
May 3 – Jeanne Landry, composer, pianist and teacher (d. 2011)
May 26 – Lorraine Monk, photographer (d. 2020)
June 9 – Fernand Seguin, biochemist, professor and television host (d. 1988)
June 11 – Erving Goffman, sociologist and writer (d. 1982)
June 22 – Richard Vollenweider, limnologist (d. 2007)

July to September

July 1 – Derek Riley, rower (d. 2018)
July 5 – Doris Margaret Anderson, nutritionist and politician (d. 2022)
July 13 – Ken Mosdell, ice hockey player (d. 2006)
July 14
 Bill Millin, piper (d. 2010)
 Gerald Myrden, businessman (d. 2016)
July 16 – Augustin Brassard, politician (d. 1971)
July 18 – Harry Kermode, basketball player (d. 2009)
July 23 – Jenny Pike, WWII servicewoman and photographer (d. 2004)
July 30 – Jack McClelland, publisher (d. 2004)
August 7 – Helmut Kallmann, historian (d. 2012)
August 11 – Mavis Gallant, writer (d. 2014)
August 24 – René Lévesque, politician, Minister and 23rd Premier of Quebec (d. 1987)
September 1 – Yvonne De Carlo, actress, dancer and singer (d. 2007)
September 3 – Salli Terri, singer, arranger, recording artist and songwriter (d. 1996)
September 16 – Alex Barris, actor and writer (d. 2004)

October to December
October 9 – Léon Dion, political scientist (d. 1997)
October 17 – Pierre Juneau, politician and film and broadcast executive (d. 2012)
November 12 – Charlotte MacLeod, writer (d. 2005)
December 3 – Muriel Millard, actress, dancer, painter, singer-songwriter (d. 2014)
December 11 – Pauline Jewett, politician and educator (d. 1992)
December 22 – Percy Smith, barrister, lawyer and politician (d. 2009)
December 25 – Steve Wochy, ice hockey player

Full date unknown
 Milt Harradence, lawyer, pilot, politician and judge (d. 2008)
 Hilda Watson, leader of the Yukon Progressive Conservative Party (d. 1997)

Deaths
January 26 – Robert Beith, politician (b. 1843)
February 4 – Joe Fortes, lifeguard (b. 1863)
April 12 – Robert Boston, politician (b. 1836)
May 23 – Robert Franklin Sutherland, politician and Speaker of the House of Commons of Canada (b. 1859)
July 22 – Sara Jeannette Duncan, author and journalist (b. 1861)
August 2 – Alexander Graham Bell, scientist, inventor, engineer and innovator who is credited with inventing the first practical telephone (b. 1847)
December 3 – William Proudfoot, politician and barrister (b. 1859)

See also
 List of Canadian films

Historical documents
With words like "hypocrisy" and "criminal disregard," Peter Bryce outlines his efforts to end government inaction on Indigenous health

Letter criticizes failure to assist homeless veterans in Montreal

Dominion Veterans' Alliance calls for no fishing licences to "Orientals" (unless veterans of France) and exclusion of "alien Asiatics"

Observations of artist Mary Riter Hamilton, returned from painting tour of First World War battlefields

"A stalwart peasant in a sheep-skin coat, born on the soil,[...]is good quality" - Clifford Sifton's  
idea of good choices for agricultural immigration

Sifton speaks on Canada's conflicted status as both sovereign country and British dominion

Tight money causes U.S. farmers to consider Canada

Call for return of Wheat Board to help near-bankrupt western farmers forced to sell wheat below world price

B.C. MP claims canneries favour Japanese Canadians to exclusion of whites, but cannery president says whites are just lazy

First human insulin trial on young diabetes patient is encouraging

Article about Jews who made Quebec "the cradle of Jewish political emancipation in the British Empire"

Sen. Raoul Dandurand advises colleagues to keep Senate non-partisan, without "victors and vanquished"

At its founding convention, Canadian Trotskyite tells Workers Party of Canada it will unify labour for international revolution

Call for women to fight capitalism, "the home-wrecker"

Premier details origins and successes of prohibition in Ontario

Article reports activities of arsonist ghost in Antigonish County, Nova Scotia

Mysterious wreck in upper St. Lawrence River may be British warship

References

 
Years of the 20th century in Canada
Canada
1922 in North America